Argodrepana denticulata is a moth in the family Drepanidae. It was described by Wilkinson in 1967. It is widely distributed in Indonesian New Guinea.

References

Moths described in 1967
Drepaninae
Moths of New Guinea